Myra Abigail "Abbie" Pratt (née Pankhurst and formerly Wright, later Daria, Princess Karageorgevich, March 21, 1859 – June 26, 1938) was an American golfer who competed in the 1900 Summer Olympics. She won the bronze medal in the women's competition.

Born Abigail Pankhurst, her first husband was Herbert Wright. It is unclear whether Wright died in 1880 or the two were divorced in the 1890s. She later married Thomas Huger Pratt shortly before the 1900 Olympics. The two were frequently in Europe and were members of the Dinard Golf Club in France. Huger Pratt played in the handicap event (which is not recognized as Olympic), not starting in the main men's tournament. Abbie Pratt finished third in the women's competition, with a score of 53 in the 9-hole stroke play tournament.

The fate of Abbie Pratt's marriage to Thomas is also unclear. He may have died in 1905, or possibly in 1907. Alternatively, he may have instead gone missing in 1907; there is one newspaper article reporting that Abbie Pratt was seeking a divorce then due to his disappearance. Another article indicates that he died in 1912 while still married to Abbie.

Pratt married Prince Alexis Karageorgevich on June 11, 1913, in Paris, taking the name Daria as her royal name.

References

External links
 

American female golfers
Amateur golfers
Golfers at the 1900 Summer Olympics
Olympic bronze medalists for the United States in golf
Medalists at the 1900 Summer Olympics
Golfers from Cleveland
Serbian princesses
Princesses by marriage
Karađorđević dynasty
American emigrants to France
1859 births
1938 deaths